

Wombats Rest is a locality in the Australian state of South Australia located in the state’s east on the western side of the Murray River about  north-east of the state capital of Adelaide and about  north-east of the municipal seat of Mannum.

Its boundaries were created on 27 March 2003, for the “long established name.”

Land use within Wombats Rest is entirely residential accommodation whose historical use is for “‘holiday’ occupancy” and which is known as a shack site in Australia.  Development within the locality has limits due to its location within the Murray River’s floodplain to “minimise damage to buildings” caused by regular flooding.

The 2016 Australian census which was conducted in August 2016, reports that Wombats Rest had a population of zero.

Wombats Rest is located within the federal division of Barker, the state electoral district of Chaffey and the local government area of the Mid Murray Council.

References

Towns in South Australia
Riverland